Pick is a 2019 Canadian short drama film, directed by Alicia K. Harris. The film stars Hazel Downey as Alliyah, a young Black Canadian girl struggling to cope with the social consequences of having chosen to go to school on class photo day wearing her natural Afro instead of straightening her hair.

The film was funded in part by a crowdfunding campaign on Kickstarter, and entered production in 2018. It premiered in September 2019 at the Urbanworld Film Festival.

The film won the Canadian Screen Award for Best Live Action Short Drama at the 8th Canadian Screen Awards in 2020.

References

External links
 

2019 films
2019 short films
Black Canadian films
Best Live Action Short Drama Genie and Canadian Screen Award winners
Films set in Canada
2010s English-language films
Canadian drama short films
2010s Canadian films